Lo Uk Tsuen is a village in Ha Tsuen, Yuen Long District, Hong Kong.

Administration
Lo Uk Tsuen is a recognized village under the New Territories Small House Policy.

References

External links
 Delineation of area of existing village Lo Uk Tsuen (Ha Tsuen) for election of resident representative (2019 to 2022)

Villages in Yuen Long District, Hong Kong
Ha Tsuen